OIP Sensor Systems is a Belgian defence and space company.

History 

From its foundation until the 1950s, OIP developed military lenses and objectives, medical and scientific microscopes, as well as cameras and photocopy machines for the industry. From the 1960s on, it was one of the first European companies to enter the emerging electro-optical market, with innovations such as one of the first heads-up display for the Lockheed F-104 Starfighter and fire control systems for the Leopard 1 battle tanks in Belgium, Canada and Australia together with SABCA. The company also manufactures holographic night vision googles, and participates in space projects.

On 1 July 2003, the company was acquired from Delft Instruments (nl) by Elbit Systems.

See also 
 PROBA-V

References

External links 
 Official website

Defense companies of Belgium